Sir Raghunath Purushottam Paranjpye (16 February 1876 – 6 May 1966) was the first Indian to achieve the coveted title of Senior Wrangler at the University of Cambridge, and became a university administrator and Indian ambassador.

Early life and education 
Raghunath Paranjpye was born at Murdi near Dapoli in the coastal Ratnagiri district of Maharashtra in a Chitpavan Brahmin family. He was educated at Maratha high school, Bombay, Fergusson College, Pune and Bombay University before entering St John's College, Cambridge in 1896. He graduated B.A. as senior Wrangler in 1899. Paranjpye was elected a Fellow of St John's College in November 1901 and stayed as such until 1907, but returned to India to become a professor of mathematics at Fergusson College in 1902. One of the earliest Indian documentary film makers, H. S. Bhatavdekar, made silent documentary films, Return of Wrangler Paranjpye (1902) and Delhi Durbar of Lord Curzon (1903), featuring R. P.

Career
In 1907, R. P. became the first librarian of the Indian Mathematical Society at Fergusson College. He became the college's principal, and stayed in that position for two decades, until 1926. Subsequently, he consecutively became the Vice-Chancellor of Bombay University and Lucknow University. In 1921, the University of Calcutta awarded him an honorary Doctor of Science degree.

Sir Raghunath was elected to the Bombay Legislative Council in 1912 representing the University of Bombay constituency. He was again elected to the enlarged Council as per the Government of India Act 1919. As part of Diarchy in Bombay Presidency, Paranjpye was appointed as the first Minister for Education and he served in the position till 1923. He was unable to get elected in the 1923 elections losing to M. R. Jayakar of the Swaraj Party.

Paranjpye received a knighthood from the colonial government in 1942. In the three years (1944–1947) preceding India's independence from the British Raj, the British government appointed him India's High Commissioner to Australia. In the days of the British Raj, there was some criticism that R. P. had often appeared on the side of British authorities at a time of nationalist ferment in India.

He was the founder of the Indian Rationalist Association in Chennai (then Madras) in 1949, and remained its President for many years. His autobiography, 84 Not Out, appeared in 1961.

Acharya Atre has devoted one full chapter in his autobiography for Wrangler Paranjpye and has written about his fame all over the country and how because of him students from outside Maharashtra came to study at Ferguson College.

Family
His younger brother, Hari Purushottam Paranjpye was a well known agriculturist of his time. In 1991, the Government of India awarded R. P.'s daughter Shakuntala Paranjpye a Padma Bhushan title in recognition of her work in the field of family planning. She was also a nominated member of the Rajya Sabha in the 1960s In 2006, the Government of India awarded R. P.'s granddaughter Sai Paranjpye a Padma Bhushan title in recognition of her artistic talents. She is a film director and a scriptwriter.

Works
 Dhondo Keshav Karve: A Sketch, Poona, Arya Bhushan Press, 1915.
 Gopal Krishna Gokhale, The Aryabhushan Press, 1918.
 The Crux of the Indian Problem. Watts, 1931.
 The National Liberal Federation, Presidential address. Allahabad, 1939. Vithal Hari Barve, 1939.
 84 Not Out, National Book Trust, New Delhi, 1961.
 Rationalism In Practice: The Kamala Lectures, Kessinger Publishing, LLC, 2006. .

References

 R.P. Paranjpye, 84 Not Out, National Book Trust, New Delhi, 1961.  Autobiography.
 Wrangler Raghunath Purushottam Paranjpye by Dr Anant Deshmukh, 2011. Biography.
 John Kenneth Galbraith, Ambassador's Journal Publisher, Houghton Mifflin Company (1969) Language: English

External links
 
 
  First Indian Wrangler : Raghunath Purushottam Paranjape from Dapoli 

1876 births
1966 deaths
Alumni of St John's College, Cambridge
Fellows of St John's College, Cambridge
High Commissioners of India to Australia
19th-century Indian mathematicians
Senior Wranglers
Scientists from Maharashtra
University of Mumbai alumni
Academic staff of the University of Mumbai
Academic staff of the University of Lucknow
Knights Bachelor
Indian Knights Bachelor
Indian atheists
Presidents of the Indian Mathematical Society
20th-century Indian mathematicians
Members of the Bombay Legislative Council